The 2008–09 Kuwaiti Premier League season was the 47th since its establishment. The first matches of the season started on Saturday 4 October 2008. The league has also been extended so that clubs will play each other three times this season.

Members clubs

Managerial changes

Final standings

Scorers
13 goals
 Careca

10 goals
 Bader Al Mutawa
 Firas Al Khatib

8 goals
 Faraj Laheeb
 Anthony Topango

7 goals
 Markovic
 Jehad Al Hussein

6 goals
 Fahad Al-Rashidi
 Khalaf Al-Salamah
 Khalid Ajab

5 goals
 Mohamed Mubarak
 Yousef Naser
 Danny Mrwanda
 Saleh Al Sheikh

4 goals
 Fahad Al Hamad
 Arago Silva
 Ismail Al Ajmi
 Abdulla Al Buraiky
 Khaled Khalaf

References

 

Kuwait Premier League seasons
1
Kuw